The Gò Mun culture (c. 1,100-800 BC) was a culture of Bronze Age northern Vietnam.

The culture is known for pottery, weapons and many jade objects.

Gallery

References

Ancient Vietnam
Archaeological cultures of Southeast Asia
Archaeological cultures in Vietnam
Bronze Age cultures of Asia
1st millennium BC in Vietnam